Pablo Berger Uranga (born 1963) is a Spanish film director born in Bilbao, Spain.

Life and work
Pablo Berger attended primary and secondary school in Artxanda Trueba, located on the outskirts of Bilbao, Spain. In 1988 he directed his first short film, Mamá (Mum) with artistic director Álex de la Iglesia and Ramon Barea. With the financial winnings from a grant from the Provincial Council of Biscay, he went to study for a masters in film at New York University. 

After getting his Ph.D., he worked as a professor of management at the New York Film Academy. Thereafter, he began a parallel career as a publicist and producer of music, culminating in 2003 with his film Torremolinos 73, with Javier Cámara, Fernando Tejero and Candela Peña.

In 2012 he premiered his third film Blancanieves (Snow White), which was the Spanish representative of the Academy Awards in 2013, in the category of Academy Award for Best Foreign Language Film. Blancanieves won ten Goya Awards, including Best Picture and Best Original Screenplay. It also received  the trophy of the 9th edition of Bucharest International Film Festival

Filmography
Mamá (1988)
Torremolinos 73 (2003)
Blancanieves (2012)
Abracadabra (2017)

He also appears as a guest in the documentary Herederos de la bestia (2016).

Footnotes

1963 births
Spanish film directors
People from Bilbao
Living people
21st-century Spanish screenwriters